Brinley is an unincorporated community in Preble County, in the U.S. state of Ohio.

History
A former variant name was Brinleys Station. Brinleys Station had its start in 1855 when Sylvester Brinley gave a portion of his land for a railroad station, in exchange for naming rights. A post office was established under the name Brinleys Station in 1860, the name was changed to Brinley in 1882, and the post office closed in 1902.

References

Unincorporated communities in Preble County, Ohio
Unincorporated communities in Ohio